Daniel Charles Handley (27 April 1985 – 2 October 1994) was a British child who was abducted from a street near his home and murdered in 1994 by Timothy John Morss (born 11 March 1963) and his boyfriend, Brett Tyler (born 21 June 1965). Both men were later sentenced to life imprisonment for abducting, sexually assaulting and murdering Handley. The couple, along with two others, received fifty-year tariffs imposed by Home Secretary David Blunkett in 2002.

The crime
Daniel Handley was fixing a chain on his bicycle in Beckton, East London, on 2 October 1994, when he was approached by two men in a Peugeot 405. The men had been cruising the area looking for a young, pre-teen, fair-haired boy to make real their fantasy of abducting such a boy, sexually abusing him and then murdering him. The driver of the car claimed to be lost, and asked Handley to show him directions on a map. The map was placed across the back seat of the car and, when Daniel leaned inside to look at it, one of the men pushed him into the car and the other drove them off. They drove Handley to a flat, where each man sexually abused him in turn while the other videoed the activity with a camcorder. Afterwards, they took Handley to a layby near Hungerford in Berkshire, where he was again sexually abused before being strangled to death with a car tow rope.

Handley's killers dumped his body in a shallow grave near a golf course close to Morss' home in Bradley Stoke, near Bristol, before returning later to bury it deeper. His skull was found in March 1995, after it had been disturbed by foxes – five months after he was last seen alive.

Trial
The pair were found guilty of Handley's murder at the Old Bailey on 17 May 1996. They were sentenced to life imprisonment by the trial judge, who condemned them as "vultures" and recommended that they should never be set free. After their trial, it was revealed that the pair were serial child sex offenders who had also abused children in the Philippines.

The pair had met whilst incarcerated at Wormwood Scrubs Prison during the early 1990s for child sex offences. Morss was convicted of raping two young boys in 1986, and had his seven-year sentence cut to five on 2 November 1986. Tyler had been arrested for indecency with young boys and sentenced to four years in prison.

Morss lived in Bradley Stoke on the outskirts of Bristol where he co-owned and ran a minicab firm. Morss and Tyler fled to the Philippines after Handley's death, but when Morss returned to England, the child's body had been found and he was quickly arrested on suspicion of murder. Tyler had to be extradited back to England to stand trial. One of the killers later recalled "the feeling of sexual excitement when I grabbed his body and pushed him into the car, the fear of being caught and the excitement that we might get away with it. It was like a fantasy."

Sentencing changes

On 24 November 2002, the pair were two of four child murderers (the others being Howard Hughes and Roy Whiting) who received 50-year tariffs imposed by Home Secretary David Blunkett, effectively meaning that they will remain in prison until at least 2045 and the ages of 82 and 80 respectively. However, this system was declared illegal within 24 hours by the European Court of Human Rights as well as the High Court for England and Wales, following a legal challenge by convicted double murderer Anthony Anderson. The final decision on a life sentence prisoner's minimum term now rests with the High Court following a recommendation by the trial judge.

See also
List of kidnappings
List of solved missing person cases

References

1994 in London
1994 murders in the United Kingdom
1990s trials
Beckton
Crime in Gloucestershire
History of the London Borough of Newham
Male murder victims
Murder in Berkshire
Incidents of violence against boys
Murder trials
October 1994 crimes
October 1994 events in the United Kingdom
Pedophilia
Trials in London
West Berkshire District
Violence against men in the United Kingdom